Peter Perner is an Austrian para-alpine skier. He represented Austria at five Winter Paralympics: 1976, 1980, 1984, 1988 and 1992.

In total, he won two gold medals, two silver medals and one bronze medal at the Winter Paralympics.

He also competed at the Men's giant slalom for single-leg amputees event at disabled skiing, a demonstration sport during the 1984 Winter Olympics.

Achievements

See also 
 List of Paralympic medalists in alpine skiing

References 

Living people
Year of birth missing (living people)
Place of birth missing (living people)
Paralympic alpine skiers of Austria
Alpine skiers at the 1976 Winter Paralympics
Alpine skiers at the 1980 Winter Paralympics
Alpine skiers at the 1984 Winter Paralympics
Alpine skiers at the 1988 Winter Paralympics
Alpine skiers at the 1992 Winter Paralympics
Medalists at the 1976 Winter Paralympics
Medalists at the 1980 Winter Paralympics
Medalists at the 1984 Winter Paralympics
Paralympic gold medalists for Austria
Paralympic silver medalists for Austria
Paralympic bronze medalists for Austria
Paralympic medalists in alpine skiing
Austrian amputees
20th-century Austrian people